Salvador Mejía Alejandre (born February 12, 1961 in Toluca, State of Mexico, Mexico) is a Mexican producer and director.

Personal life
He is married with also producer Nathalie Lartilleux, his former associate producer on his first telenovelas.

Filmography

Awards and nominations

Premios TVyNovelas

References

External links

1961 births
Living people
Mexican telenovela producers
People from Toluca